John Armstrong (13 October 1775 – 17 March 1854) was a British civil engineer who worked on a number of canals, bridges and tunnels, mostly in Bristol and London. From 1831 to 1854 he was the City Surveyor for Bristol.

Career

Armstrong was born in Ingram, Northumberland and, after receiving little formal education, became a millwright's apprentice in Bill Quay. In 1800 he moved to Bath and worked on several projects in the area, including the repairs to Pulteney Bridge and the construction of Bristol Harbour and Westgate Bridge.
From 1821 he worked on projects in London and South East England such as Rochester Bridge and Grosvenor Canal.
He was briefly the resident engineer for Marc Isambard Brunel's Thames Tunnel project but resigned due to poor health in August 1826, to be replaced by Isambard Kingdom Brunel.
After his resignation he worked for Bramah and Co at St Katherine Docks and managing property development. He joined the Institution of Civil Engineers on 11 March 1828.
In 1831 he became Bristol City Surveyor, a position he held until his death on 17 March 1854.

References

1775 births
1854 deaths
People from Northumberland
English civil engineers
People from Bath, Somerset
Engineers from Bristol